Galgibaga Beach also called Galgibagh Beach is a beach in south Goa. It is one of the lesser-known and cleanest beaches of India. It located in the south of Goa in Canacona region, 7 km from famous Palolem Beach. Galgibaga beach is reported to be a nesting ground for Olive Ridley turtles.

See also 
 Tourism in Goa

References

Beaches of Goa
Beaches of South Goa district